Child Online Protection (COP) is an initiative which is established by International Telecommunication Union in November 2008 within the framework of the Global Cybersecurity Agenda (GCA). The initiative was supported by the United Nations Secretary-General, states and several international organizations. COP is an international collaborative network to protect children worldwide against cyber threats by providing legal, technical and organizational measures.

Objectives
COP main objectives are as follows:
 Identification of risks and vulnerabilities to children in cyberspace
 Creation of awareness among policymakers, industry, parents and educators as well as the children 
 Development of practical tools to help minimize risk
 Sharing knowledge and experience

ITU established a Work Group on COP and enhanced its mandate Based on RESOLUTION 179 of The Plenipotentiary Conference of the International Telecommunication Union in 2010.

Partners
ITU is working with the following organizations on COP:
 UNICEF
 UNODC
 UNICRI
 UNIDIR
 European Commission
 Interpol
 ENISA (European Network and Information Security Agency)
 Insafe
 Commonwealth Telecommunications Organisation (CTO)
 IMPACT
In addition, there several civil society and private sector organization who participate in the project.

See also 

 International Telecommunication Union
 Murder of Carly Ryan - details related to "Carly's Law" and online grooming laws in Australia

References

External links 
 https://www.itu.int/en/cop/Pages/default.aspx

Protection
International Telecommunication Union